Jeremiah Keith Pharms Jr. (born October 16, 1996) is an American football defensive tackle for the New England Patriots of the National Football League (NFL). He previously played for the Pittsburgh Maulers of the United States Football League. He played college football at Sacramento City College, San Joaquin Delta College, and Friends University.

Pharms’s father Jeremiah Pharms played college football at the University of Washington, and was on the 2000 team that won the Rose Bowl. Jeremiah has three kids of his own Jaylah Pharms (7), Jayda Pharms (5) and Jaylynn Pharms (0) along with a fiancé, Baylee.

Professional career

Pittsburgh Maulers
Pharms went undrafted in 2019, and played with the Wichita Force of the Champions Indoor Football League in 2021. He was then drafted by Pittsburgh Maulers of the USFL in 2022, recording 22 tackles and two sacks on the year.

New England Patriots
Following the conclusion of the USFL season, Pharms signed with the New England Patriots of the NFL on July 19, 2022. He was waived on August 30, 2022 and signed to the practice squad the next day. He signed a reserve/future contract on January 10, 2023.

References

External links
Sacramento City Panthers bio
San Joaquin Delta Mustangs bio
Friends Falcons bio
New England Patriots bio

1996 births
Living people
American football defensive linemen
Sacramento City Panthers football players
Delta College Mustangs football players
Friends Falcons football players
Wichita Force players
Pittsburgh Maulers (2022) players
New England Patriots players